Phaniyamma is a 1983 Indian Kannada award-winning drama film directed and produced by Prema Karanth. The story is based on acclaimed novelist M. K. Indira's 1977 Sahitya Academy Award-winning novel of the same name. The film highlighted the plight of a widow and her struggle for survival.

The film's cast included many players from a theatrical background including L. V. Sharadha, Prathibha Kasaravalli, Archana Rao, Vishwanath Rao and Kasaragod Chinna. Actor Ananth Nag made a guest appearance in the film.

The film was widely appreciated by critics and audience upon release. It went on to win National Film Award for Best Feature Film in Kannada and many International film awards. The film also was awarded multiple Karnataka State Film Awards including Best Film, Best Supporting actress and Best Story writer.

Cast 
 L. V. Sharadha
 Baby Prathima
 Pratibha Kasaravalli
 Archana Rao
 Poornima Gaonkar
 Vishwanath Rao
 Kasaragodu Chinna
 Malathi Sridhar
 Bhavani
 Chidanand
 Ananth Nag in a guest appearance
 Venugopal Kasaragod in a guest appearance

Soundtrack 
The music of the film was composed by B. V. Karanth to the lyrics of Chandrashekhara Kambara.

Awards
The film has won the following awards since its release.

1982 National Film Awards (India)
 Won – National Film Award for Best Feature Film in Kannada

1982-83 Karnataka State Film Awards (India)
 Won – Karnataka State Film Award for Best Film
 Won – Karnataka State Film Award for Best Supporting Actress – Archana Rao
 Won – Karnataka State Film Award for Best Story – M. K. Indira
This film screened at 9th IFFI.

References

External links 
 
 A detailed biography of novelist M. K. Indira.

1983 films
1980s Kannada-language films
Films based on Indian novels
Best Kannada Feature Film National Film Award winners
1983 directorial debut films